Taberannang “Peter” Timeon is an I-Kiribati politician, member of the Maneaba ni Maungatabu (parliament) for Tabiteuea North (last elected 2020). Until 2013, he was member of the Cabinet of Kiribati. In mid-October 2013, he has resigned from Anote Tong’s government as Minister for Communications, Transport and Tourism, having been accused of receiving an excessive allowance payment.

He is re-elected during the 2020 Kiribati parliamentary election.
He was candidate for the Beretitenti during the February 2003 Kiribati presidential election.

References

Year of birth missing (living people)
Living people
Government ministers of Kiribati
Members of the House of Assembly (Kiribati)
21st-century I-Kiribati politicians